Farsban (also Romanized as Fārsbān; also known as Fārespān, Fārsīān, Farsīyan, and Parīsvān) is a village in Solgi Rural District, Khezel District, Nahavand County, Hamadan Province, Iran. At the 2006 census, its population was 1,228, in 323 families.

References 

Populated places in Nahavand County